Peinnegon is a village in Kyain Seikgyi Township, Kawkareik District, in the Kayin State of Myanmar. It is on the foothills of the Dawna Range.

References

External links
 "Peinnegon Map — Satellite Images of Peinnegon" Maplandia World Gazetteer
 

Populated places in Kayin State